Craig Michael Bartlett (born October 18, 1956) is an American animator. He wrote, directed, created, and produced the Nickelodeon television series Hey Arnold! and the PBS Kids television series Dinosaur Train and Ready Jet Go!.

Career
Bartlett's first job, after graduating from The Evergreen State College in Olympia, Washington, was at Will Vinton Studios in Portland, Oregon, where he learned the art of stop-motion animation, working on movies such as The Adventures of Mark Twain. Bartlett moved to Los Angeles in 1987 to animate the "Penny" claymations for the second season of Pee-wee's Playhouse on CBS. He later made an animated ID for NBC with Klasky Csupo.

He later worked at BRC Imagination Arts, directing projects such as Postcards and Mystery Lodge for Knott's Berry Farm. He also animated the music video for "Jurassic Park" by "Weird Al" Yankovic from the 1994 album Alapalooza.

Bartlett met the Nickelodeon execs while story editing Rugrats in its first three seasons. He pitched Hey Arnold! to them in the fall of 1993 and produced a pilot the next spring. The series was greenlit in January 1995. Hey Arnold! was in production continuously from 1995 to 2001, made by Bartlett's own production company, Snee-Oosh, Inc., which he founded in 1986. The series culminated in a TV movie originally titled Arnold Saves the Neighborhood, but Nickelodeon decided to release it theatrically as Hey Arnold!: The Movie, in June 2002.

A dispute over a second planned Arnold movie resulted in Bartlett leaving Nickelodeon to write, direct and produce an animated TV movie for Cartoon Network called Party Wagon, a story originally intended as a pilot for an ongoing series. It ended up being the first Cartoon Network movie-length pilot to be broadcast, but not picked up until Underfist: Halloween Bash, which was created by Maxwell Atoms, who created The Grim Adventures of Billy & Mandy and Evil Con Carne.

In 2002 he published the official novelization of the first Hey Arnold! movie (having written it with Maggie Groening).

In 2005 Bartlett returned to BRC to make a multimedia simulator attraction for NASA's Kennedy Space Center in Cape Canaveral, Florida, called the Shuttle Launch Experience. In the course of the three-year project, Bartlett interviewed 26 astronauts to gather their experiences from launch to orbit. One of these was four-time shuttle flier and commander and current NASA Administrator Charles F. Bolden Jr.

After developing various pilots and feature scripts, Bartlett moved to The Jim Henson Company, where he co-wrote the computer-animated film Unstable Fables: 3 Pigs and a Baby. He stayed at Henson to work as story editor on a PBS Kids preschool show called Sid the Science Kid with PBS executive Linda Simensky, whom he had worked with at Nickelodeon and Cartoon Network.

In September 2008, a show for preschoolers called Jim Henson's Dinosaur Train was picked up by PBS Kids; produced by Brian Henson, this was the first show created by Bartlett to be picked up since Hey Arnold!. The series debuted on  PBS stations on September 7, 2009.

In April 2015, Ready Jet Go! (formerly Jet Propulsion) was picked up by PBS Kids. Produced by Wind Dancer Films, the series premiered on PBS stations on February 15, 2016.

In November 2015, Viacom announced that Bartlett would return to Nickelodeon to write Hey Arnold!: The Jungle Movie. It premiered on November 24, 2017.

Personal life
Bartlett attended and graduated from Anacortes High School in Anacortes, Washington. In 1987, Bartlett married Lisa Groening, sister of Matt Groening, creator of The Simpsons, Futurama and Disenchantment, after whom Lisa Simpson is named. They have two children, Matt and Katie. In August 2018, it was reported that Craig and Lisa were going through a divorce settlement and that they had been separated since 2015.

Filmography

Internet

References

External links
 Interview with Victoria Mixon
 
 Craig Bartlett's Charmed Past Life

1956 births
Animators from Washington (state)
American storyboard artists
American animated film directors
American cartoonists
American voice directors
Living people
Artists from Seattle
Evergreen State College alumni
Stop motion animators
Clay animators
Nickelodeon Animation Studio people
Showrunners